Engelmayer is a surname. Notable people with the surname include: 

Paul A. Engelmayer (born 1961), American judge
Shammai Engelmayer (born 1945), American rabbi